Akassh Sen, known simply as Akassh, is a well known Indian Bengali music composer and singer.

Career 
He is a music director of Bengali feature films and television. He is also a singer and composer. His career started with his first album, Sweety, in 2004. Akassh Sen not only composes music for Indian films, but also composes music for the Bangladeshi films and albums as well. One of his most popular and prominent music composition is "Kotobar Bojhabo Bol" from the film "Angaar" in the voice of Mohammad Irfan.

Discography

Studio albums

Singles

Film soundtracks

As composer

As singer

Awards and nominations

References

External links
 Soundcloud
 lyrics
 lyrics
 lyrics
 lyrics
 Bengali lyrics
 YouTube

Living people
Bengali singers
1986 births
Musicians from Kolkata